In algebraic geometry, an ℓ-adic sheaf on a Noetherian scheme X is an inverse system consisting of -modules  in the étale topology and  inducing .

Bhatt–Scholze's pro-étale topology gives an alternative approach.

Motivation 
There's an equivalence between the category of local systems of -vector spaces on a nice (connected, locally path-connected, and semi-locally simply connected) topological space  and the category of finite dimensional complex representations of the fundamental group .

Now if one assume that the aforementioned equivalence exists, then  corresponds to a representation . Note that every element in the image is a unit (invertible), thus .

To remedy this, two approaches are known, one being the lisse -adic sheaf introduced in this article, another being the aforementioned pro-étale topology. These two also remedies that the étale cohomology groups are always torsion, while applications in need of non-torsion coefficients, e.g. the Lefschetz fixed-point theorem or comparison theorems, arise naturally.

Constructible and lisse ℓ-adic sheaves 
An ℓ-adic sheaf  is said to be
 constructible if each  is constructible.
 lisse if each  is constructible and locally constant.

Some authors (e.g., those of SGA 4) assume an ℓ-adic sheaf to be constructible.

This is an analog of the correspondence between local systems and continuous representations of the fundament group in algebraic topology (because of this, a lisse ℓ-adic sheaf is sometimes also called a local system).

ℓ-adic cohomology 

An ℓ-adic cohomology groups is an inverse limit of étale cohomology groups with certain torsion coefficients.

The "derived category" of constructible ℓ-adic sheaves 
In a way similar to that for ℓ-adic cohomology, the derived category of constructible -sheaves is defined essentially as

 writes "in daily life, one pretends (without getting into much trouble) that  is simply the full subcategory of some hypothetical derived category  ..."

See also 
 Fourier–Deligne transform

References 

 Exposé V, VI of

External links 
 Mathoverflow: A nice explanation of what is a smooth (ℓ-adic) sheaf?
 Number theory learning seminar 2016–2017 at Stanford

Algebraic geometry